A Child of the Ghetto is a Biograph silent film directed by D. W. Griffith in 1910. The story features a seamstress in New York City.

References

1910 films
American silent short films
American black-and-white films
Films directed by D. W. Griffith
Biograph Company films
Melodrama films
1910 drama films
Silent American drama films
1910s American films